Greenwich Dance is a dance organisation based within the Royal Borough of Greenwich, London.

History 
Founded in 1993, Greenwich Dance operated from the Borough Hall until 2018 when it moved to offices within Charlton House.

Activities
Each year, Greenwich Dance produces two festivals as part of the Royal Greenwich Festivals: Greenwich Dances and the Greenwich World Cultural Festival (based at Eltham Palace).

In 2010 Big Dance commissioned Greenwich Dance to act as the Big Dance Hub for the London Boroughs of Bexley, Bromley, Greenwich and Lewisham.

Greenwich Dance is a registered charity, and receives regular funding from Arts Council England and Royal Borough of Greenwich. It was a member of the Arts Council England’s National Portfolio of Organisations until 2018.

References

Contemporary dance in London
Dance venues in England
Dance venues in the United Kingdom
Contemporary dance in the United Kingdom
Arts organizations established in 1993
Tourist attractions in the Royal Borough of Greenwich
Theatres in the Royal Borough of Greenwich